Doe Island State Park is a public recreation area comprising the entirety of Doe Island, a  island lying some  off the eastern flank of Orcas Island in San Juan County, Washington. It has  of shoreline and a trail three-tenths of a mile long that circles the island. It is accessible only by water. Washington State Parks acquired a portion of the island from the Bureau of Land Management in 1964 for $15.27, with a second acquisition in 1967 from DNR for no cost. Activities include camping, boating, fishing, crabbing, birdwatching, and wildlife viewing.

References

External links
Doe Island Marine State Park Washington State Parks and Recreation Commission 
Doe Island Marine State Park Map Washington State Parks and Recreation Commission

Parks in San Juan County, Washington
State parks of Washington (state)
Protected areas established in 1967
1967 establishments in Washington (state)
San Juan Islands
Uninhabited islands of Washington (state)